Janaína Queiroz Cavalcante (born 2 April 1988), commonly known as Jana, is a Brazilian football defender who plays for Portuguese Campeonato Nacional de Futebol Feminino club Famalicão and the Brazil women's national team. She is a zagueira, whose strongest attributes are marking and heading.

Club career
Jana began playing futsal and progressed to playing football for her local team União Messejana, where she won the Ceará state league in 2005. In 2008 she attended a trial for Santos alongside 400 hopefuls and was one of two players to be signed up.

Jana signed with S.C. Braga for the 2017–18 Campeonato Nacional de Futebol Feminino season and quickly became an important player for the club.

After short stints in her homeland with Palmeiras and Grêmio, Jana returned to Portuguese football in August 2021, agreeing to join Famalicão.

International career
Jana was part of the Brazil under-20 selection at the 2008 South American U-20 Women's Championship and subsequent 2008 FIFA U-20 Women's World Cup. In December 2009, she won four caps for the senior Brazil women's national football team at the 2009 International Women's Football Tournament of City of São Paulo, including a debut against Chile.

She made a further appearance for Brazil in September 2013, in a 1–0 win over New Zealand at the 2013 Valais Women's Cup.

References

External links
 
 Profile at S.C. Braga 
 

1988 births
Living people
Brazilian women's footballers
Brazil women's international footballers
Brazilian expatriate sportspeople in Portugal
Expatriate women's footballers in Portugal
Expatriate women's footballers in Russia
FC Zorky Krasnogorsk (women) players
Sportspeople from Fortaleza
Women's association football defenders
Sport Club Corinthians Paulista (women) players
Santos FC (women) players
S.C. Braga (women's football) players
Campeonato Nacional de Futebol Feminino players
São José Esporte Clube (women) players
Brazilian expatriates in Portugal
Brazilian expatriates in Russia
Associação Desportiva Centro Olímpico players
F.C. Famalicão (women) players
Grêmio Foot-Ball Porto Alegrense (women) players